Clement Lim (Lim Yong En, ; born 5 April 1993) is a Singaporean swimmer who competed in the 50m and 100m freestyle, the 50m breaststroke, the 4x100m medley relay, and the 4x100m and 4x200m freestyle relay. Lim represented Singapore at the 2010 Youth Olympic Games (YOG). In 2012, Lim was diagnosed with Ankylosing Spondylitis (AS), an incurable genetic disease that affects the spin and causes stiff and sore back, but went on to capture 4 gold medals at the 2013 and 2015 Southeast Asian Games (SEA Games).

Career

At the 2009 SEA Games in Vientiane, Laos, Lim captured his first gold medal at the games with a game record time of 7:30.73s in the 4x200m freestyle relay event with teammates Marcus Cheah, Joshua Lim and Zach Ong. At the next meet in 2011, Lim captured two more gold medals in Palembang, Indonesia, in the 4x100m and the 4x200m freestyle relay events.

At the 2013 SEA Games in Naypyidaw, Myanmar, Lim once again set a game record, this time in the 4x100m freestyle relay with a time of 3:21.74s, with teammates Danny Yeo, Darren Lim and Joseph Schooling. He also captured a gold in the 4x100m medley relay with a time of 3:43.62s by swimming the final leg in 50.24s.

In his final SEA games appearance in 2015, Lim captured two more gold medals in Singapore, both in new game record time. In the 4x100m freestyle relay, Lim swam the third leg in 49.81s to help his team, which consisted of Joseph Schooling, Danny Yeo and Quah Zheng Wen, finish the race in 3:19.59s. Together with Quah Zheng Wen, Lionel Khoo and Joseph Schooling, Lim then swam the freestyle final leg of the 4x100m medley in 49.61s to complete the race in 3:38.25s.

Lim also participated in the 2014 Commonwealth Games and 2014 Asian Games, and recorded his personal best of 23.26s in 50m freestyle that year. He represented Singapore in the 2010 Youth Olympic Games.

Personal life

In 2012, while serving his National Service, Lim lost vision in his right eye and was diagnosed with Ankylosing Spondylitis (AS). The genetic disease caused inflammation of his spinal joints and gave him perpetual stiff and sore back. As a result of his condition, Lim has to rely on drugs approved by sports medical body to cope with the pain. In 2014, Lim's condition flared up and left him unable to swim for a month. The incident made him more eager to return to sports and motivated him to clock his personal best timing for 50m and 100m freestyle a few months later at the 2014 Commonwealth Games and the 2014 Asian Games.

Lim studied sports science and management at the Nanyang Technological University in Singapore.

Charity 
Lim participated in the inaugural Swim for Rheumatology event organized by the Singapore General Hospital (SGH) to create awareness for rheumatism and raise fund for rheumatology research in Singapore. The event helped raise S$103,000 for the cause.

References

External links 
 

1993 births
Living people
Singaporean male freestyle swimmers
Olympic swimmers of Singapore
Singaporean sportspeople of Chinese descent
Swimmers at the 2014 Commonwealth Games
Commonwealth Games competitors for Singapore
Competitors at the 2009 Southeast Asian Games
Competitors at the 2011 Southeast Asian Games
Competitors at the 2013 Southeast Asian Games
Competitors at the 2015 Southeast Asian Games
Southeast Asian Games medalists in swimming
Southeast Asian Games gold medalists for Singapore
Asian Games bronze medalists for Singapore
Medalists at the 2014 Asian Games
Swimmers at the 2010 Asian Games
Swimmers at the 2014 Asian Games
Asian Games medalists in swimming
21st-century Singaporean people